Anthony Collins (born May 27, 1959) is an American former professional football player who was a running back in the National Football League (NFL) and the Arena Football League (AFL). He played in Super Bowl XX as a member of the New England Patriots. He played college football at East Carolina University.

Early years
A speedy and powerful runner, Collins first garnered notoriety in high school as a starter on the 1976 New York State Class B Champion Penn Yan Academy Mustangs. He grew up with 15 siblings as one of 16 children.

NFL
Collins attended East Carolina University and was selected in the second round of the 1981 NFL Draft by the New England Patriots. Cris Crissy, one of his high school teammates, was also drafted by the Patriots that season. Collins was a Pro Bowl selection in 1983 and he played in Super Bowl XX as a member of the Patriots. He signed with the Indianapolis Colts in 1988, but was suspended for the entire season after failing a drug test. His final year in the NFL was in 1990 with the Miami Dolphins. Collins finished his NFL career with 4,647 rushing yards, 261 receptions for 2,356 yards, and 44 touchdowns in 103 games.

Collins' drug problem began when he became addicted to painkillers after suffering an ankle injury with the Patriots in 1982. After being released from the Dolphins, Collins began using cocaine.

Arena football
In 1991, Collins joined the Orlando Predators of the Arena Football League. On July 9, 1991, Collins drove his car into a lake in Orlando in an apparent suicide attempt.

In 1992 Collins continued his arena football career with the Cincinnati Rockers and scored nine touchdowns.  In 1993, Collins played his last season of arena football with the Miami Hooters.

After football
Collins educates high school athletes and their families on the college recruiting process as an educational speaker for the National Collegiate Scouting Association. He hosted an internet radio show, Sports Talk with Touchdown Tony Collins, on the VoiceAmerica Sports Channel.  Collins started a foundation in 2007 called "It's for the Kids", which works with disadvantaged youths in the Finger Lakes region of Upstate New York.  He published a book in 2012 entitled, Broken Road: Turning My Mess Into a Message.

Personal
Collins' nephew is Reggie Branch, who played for the Washington Redskins.  Collins and his wife Trudy live near Greenville, N.C.

References

1959 births
Living people
American football running backs
Cincinnati Rockers players
East Carolina Pirates football players
Miami Dolphins players
Miami Hooters players
New England Patriots players
Orlando Predators players
American Conference Pro Bowl players
People from Penn Yan, New York
Sportspeople from Sanford, Florida
Players of American football from New York (state)